The 1925 Maine Black Bears football team was an American football team that represented the University of Maine as a member of the New England Conference during the 1925 college football season. In its fifth season under head coach Fred Brice, the team compiled a 5–2–1 record, going 1–0–1 against conference opponents.

The team also lost to undefeated national champion Dartmouth by a 56 to 0 score.

Maine played its home games at Alumni Field in Orono, Maine. Oren Fraser was the team captain. Willis Barrows was the  leading scorer with six touchdowns for 36 points.

Schedule

References

Maine
Maine Black Bears football seasons
Maine Football